The Profit is an American reality television show broadcast on CNBC. On each episode Marcus Lemonis offers struggling small businesses capital investment and his expertise in exchange for an ownership stake in the company. The series premiered on July 30, 2013. The second season premiered on February 25, 2014. The second part of season 2 returned October 2014. After a successful season 2 with ratings going up +115% from last year's first season, the third season premiered Tuesday May 12, 2015.

Businesses submit applications to be visited by Marcus. Marcus meets with the owners, observes the business operations and investigates their financial records. Marcus will then evaluate the company and make an offer to buy a stake in the business over a handshake. Marcus will then assume 100% control to fix the business and make it profitable. This either leads to successful re-launches, or a falling out between Marcus and the owners.

Series overview

Episodes

Season 1

Season 2

Season 3

Season 4

Season 5

Season 6

External links
 Official page
 The Profit on Internet Movie Database
 The Profit on TV.com
 The Profit Updates - Unaffiliated site that tracks the progress of businesses that have appeared on the show and whether Marcus Lemonis is still invested in them.

References 

Lists of American non-fiction television series episodes
Lists of reality television series episodes